Kristall Máni Ingason (born 18 January 2002) is an Icelandic professional footballer who plays as a winger for the Norwegian club Rosenborg.

Club career 
Kristall Máni started his senior career when he joined Víkingur Reykjavík on loan from FC Copenhagen before the 2020 season in Iceland. He then returned to Víkingur before the 2021 season in Iceland. He  joined Rosenborg on August 1, 2022.

International career 
Kristall Máni made his debut with the national team in the friendly match against Uganda on 12 January 2022, coming on as a second-half substitute.

Career statistics

Honours 
Víkingur Reykjavík
 Úrvalsdeild: 2021
 Icelandic Cup: 2021

References

External links

2002 births
Living people
Kristall Mani Ingason
Association football wingers
Kristall Mani Ingason
Kristall Mani Ingason
Kristall Mani Ingason
Kristall Mani Ingason
Expatriate men's footballers in Denmark
Kristall Mani Ingason